Berber is a town in the River Nile state of northern Sudan,  north of Atbara, near the junction of the Atbara River and the Nile.

Overview
The town was the starting-point of the old caravan route across the Nubian Desert to the Red Sea at Suakin and flagged in importance after the 1906 completion of a spur of the Sudan Military Railway to Suakin from a junction closer to the Atbara River.

English explorer Samuel Baker passed through Berber on his discovery of Albert Nyanza Lake, in 1861.

References

Populated places in River Nile (state)